Mudaliyar Thomas Rodrigo (11 April 1868 – 7 October 1945) was a Ceylonese entrepreneur. He is the owner of the Pagado Tea Rooms.

Born in Panadura to Jeronimus Rodrigo and Prolentina Soysa, his grandfather was Anthony Rodrigo, a Patabendi Mahathmaya. We was the youngest of four brothers. He received his education at Prince of Wales College, Moratuwa.

Following his schooling, he entered public service as a Clerk in the Attorney General's Department in the Solicitor General's staff. He went on to serve as the Chief Clerk, until his early retirement. The thereafter moved into business in the plantations sector having purchased Rock Cave Estate in Walgama. He then purchased a share of ownership of restaurant Pagoda Tea Rooms in Chatham Street, Fort. The British Government of Ceylon granted him the titular honor of Mudaliyar. He was a member of the Board of Management of the Colombo YMBA and the Sri Sumangala College.

He married Emily Roslyn Fernando from Beruwela and had three sons, Cyril, Percy and Leslie and five daughters, Gertrude, Rita, Beatrice, Ena and Ethel. His son Cyril Rodrigo carried on the family business founded Cyril Rodrigo Restaurants, which started the Green Cabin franchise in Sri Lanka. His son-in-law was Vice Admiral Asoka de Silva, who severed as the Commander of the Sri Lanka Navy from 1983 to 1986 and Sri Lankan Ambassador to Cuba.

See also
List of political families in Sri Lanka

External links and references

The Rodrigo Ancestry

Sinhalese civil servants
Sinhalese businesspeople
Sri Lankan Buddhists
Mudaliyars of Ceylon
Alumni of Prince of Wales' College, Moratuwa
People from British Ceylon